Big Sound was a Canadian produced television programme which aired for a run of 22 episodes. The show was set in the offices of a fictional record label, concentrating on the interactions between characters therein. It starred Greg Evigan. As a satire, its aim was to poke fun at the superficial nature of the record industry, and celebrity in general. It featured numerous guest stars well known in the music business such as Scott Stapp, Matthew Good, and Bif Naked among others. It was shot entirely in Vancouver. Other notable guest star include The Walking Dead 's actress Laurie Holden.
The show was nominated for several awards including one from Directors Guild of Canada, and in 2001, two Gemini Awards.

External links
 
Epguides's Big Sound episode guide

CTV Television Network original programming
2000 Canadian television series debuts
2001 Canadian television series endings
2000s Canadian sitcoms
Works about the music industry